Ighiu is a commune located in Alba County, Transylvania, Romania. The commune is composed of five villages: Bucerdea Vinoasă (Borosbocsárd), Ighiel (Igenpataka), Ighiu, Șard (Sárd) and Țelna (Celna). 

The commune is located in the southeastern corner of the Transylvanian Plateau, about 10 km northwest of Alba Iulia and 17 km southwest of Teiuș. The Ighiu river passes through Ighiel and Ighiu villages before discharging into the Ampoi river in Șard.

Both Șard and Ighiu have fortified churches. The latter one, the Reformed Church of Ighiu, is part of an architectural ensemble dating back to the 15th century, with the present church having been built in 1781–1783. The Hungarian theologian and historian Péter Bod was pastor there from 1749 to his death, in 1768; his tomb is in the church's courtyard.

Natives
Ádám Récsey

See also
Castra of Ighiu

References

Communes in Alba County
Localities in Transylvania